Sartakeh (also Romanized as Sārtakeh and Sār Tekeh) is a village in Gavork-e Sardasht Rural District, in the Central District of Sardasht County, West Azerbaijan Province, Iran. At the 2006 census, its population was 304, in 47 families.

References 

Populated places in Sardasht County